Daman Kuh Rural District is a rural district (dehestan) in the Central District of Esfarayen County, North Khorasan Province, Iran. At the 2006 census, its population was 7,887, in 1,825 families.  The rural district has 15 villages.

References 

Rural Districts of North Khorasan Province
Esfarayen County